The High Court of Justice of the Canary Islands (in Spanish: Tribunal Superior de Justicia de Canarias) is the highest organ of the judicial power in the autonomous community of Canary Islands (Spain). It has its seat in Las Palmas de Gran Canaria.

History 
Its most direct antecedent were the former Territorial Courts born in 1812. The current High Court of Justice of the Canary Islands was created in 1985 from Article 26 of the Organic Law of the Judiciary, being constituted on May 23, 1989.

Jurisdictions 
The High Court of Justice of the Canary Islands is the jurisdictional body in which the judicial organization in the autonomous community culminates, without prejudice to the competence reserved to the Supreme Court.

Organization 
The High Court of the Canary Islands is divided into four organs:

 The Governing Chamber
 The Civil and Criminal Chamber
 The Chamber for Contentious-Administrative Matters
 The Social Chamber

Seat 
Also in Santa Cruz de Tenerife is one of the administrative litigation chambers and one of the social chambers.

Presidency 
The current president of the Superior Court of Justice of the Canary Islands is Juan Luis Lorenzo Bragado.

See also 
 Separation of Powers
 High courts of justice (Spain)
 Statute of Autonomy of Canarias of 1982

References

External links 
 Official page of the Superior Court of Justice of the Canary Islands

Canary Islands
Canary Islands